Whitneyomyia is a genus of horse flies in the family Tabanidae. There is at least one described species in Whitneyomyia, W. beatifica.

References

Tabanidae
Diptera of North America
Brachycera genera